Adolf Lehnert (20 July 1862 – 6 January 1948) was a Leipzig sculptor and medal designer.

Life

Family 
Franz Robert Adolf Lehnert was born in Leipzig, the second of his parents' twelve recorded children.   His father, also called Adolf Lehnert, was an engine driver.  His mother, born Lina Werner, was originally from Borna (to the southeast of the city).

In 1889 Lehnert married Else Riedel, daughter of the composer-musical director Carl Riedel.   This connected him to one of Leipzig's leading artistic families.   Sadly, however, the marriage was childless and Else died in 1907. Lehnert's second marriage was to Johanna Wildenhayn (1875–1957).   This marriage resulted in two recorded children:  Siegfried (1910–1941) and Waltraut (1916–2007).

Education 
After leaving school Adolf Lehnert studied at the Leipzig Arts Academy ("Hochschule für Grafik und Buchkunst Leipzig") between 1880 and 1888.   His principal teacher was Melchior zur Straßen. At the academy's annual exhibitions of its students' work he received a bronze medal in 1882 and a silver medal in 1885.   After completion of his course at the academy he undertook a further study year in Rome and Paris.

Teaching 
Between 1896 and 1924 Lehnert taught at the Arts Academy.   Early on he was invited to deputise for his teacher, Melchior zur Straßen.  After the latter suddenly died Lehnert was officially appointed to succeed him as head of the sculpture classes with effect from 1 December 1897.   Topics he taught included "Still life forms", "Life model forms" and "Measures of the human form".   In 1907 he was given the title of "Professor".   His students included Kurt Schmid-Ehmen, Bruno Eyermann, Fritz Zalisz, Fritz Maenicke, Albrecht Leistner, Max Alfred Brumme, Paul Stuckenbruck and Alfred Thiele.   It was Thiele who would succeed him as head of the sculpture department at the Arts Academy.

Artistic output 
Adolf Lehnert was one of the leading exponents of Historicism in Leipzig.   He undertook many public and private commissions, and his output is thereby well recorded.  In his home city he was involved in providing decorative art work for Leipzig's New (in 1905) City Hall.   He worked on the University Library, the nearby German Book Repository and the striking Jugendstil Arts Palace ("Künstlerhaus ").

Leipzig was a well heeled city, and Lehnert also received plenty of work on villa decorations and memorials.   His work included elaborate tomb stones, allegorical figures, elaborate friezes and busts, along with reliefs and small sculptures.   He was in particular demand as a Portraitist and medal designer.   His approach built on the idealistic style of his teacher, Melchior, but with ever more precise individualisation.   In that respect he can be seen as the founder of a Leipzig portrait art tradition.

Lehnert designed a series of very appealing angel figures, approximately 135 cm high, for the Württemberg Metalwares Factory (then, as now, best known as a cutlery manufacturer).   These were cast in Electroformed metal and can still be found in German cemeteries and former cemeteries.   They were available "with or without wings", identified in the company's catalogue as "Grave statuette No.745 by Lehnert". There is also one of these angels at the Grave Art Museum in Kassel.

From 1912 he lived and worked in a villa, with its own studio attached, in Markkleeberg which had been built according to his own plans. Later he moved again to a villa in Stötteritz where he passed his final years.

Many of Leinhart's works, cast in copper or bronze, were melted down during the first and second world wars in response to materials shortages.

References

1862 births
1948 deaths
Artists from Leipzig
People from the Kingdom of Saxony
German medallists
German printmakers
19th-century German sculptors
20th-century German sculptors
20th-century German male artists
Academic staff of the University of Music and Theatre Leipzig